Indoxysticus is a genus of Asian crab spiders that was first described by S. P. Benjamin & Z. Jaleel in 2010.  it contains three species, all found in Asia: I. lumbricus, I. minutus, and I. tangi. The genus differs from others in its family by the oval-shaped spermathecae with well-defined chambers in females and by the broad-based embolus in males.

They live in vegetation as opposed to related genus Xysticus, which lives on the ground.

References

Further reading

Araneomorphae genera
 
Spiders of China
Spiders of the Indian subcontinent
Thomisidae